Disgorge may refer to:

 Disgorge (American band), an American death metal band
 Disgorgement (law), a legal remedy
 Disgorger, a piece of fishing equipment
 Disgorging (dégorgement), a technique in sparkling wine production

See also
 Regurgitation (disambiguation)